Gordon Monahan (born 1956 in Kingston, Ontario) is a Canadian pianist and composer of experimental music. He has been active since at least 1978. Along with his own work, he has performed works by other composers such as John Cage, James Tenney, Udo Kasemets and Roberto Paci Dalò. He has also created site-specific sound installations. In 1992-93 he was artist-in-residence with the DAAD in Berlin where he lived until 2006.

Awards
Monahan won first prize at the 1984 CBC National Radio Competition for Young Composers.
He is one of six Laureates to receive Governor General's Awards for Visual and Media Arts in 2013.
 2016: Sound Artist of the City of Bonn, Germany.

Notable works

Piano Mechanics  (1981-1986)
Speaker Swinging (1982)
Piano Mechanics (1982)
Long Aeolian Piano (1984/88)
Music From Nowhere (1989)
Aquaeolian Whirlpool (1990)
Spontaneously Harmonious in Certain Kinds of Weather (1996)
Multiple Machine Matrix (1994-8)
Theremin in the Rain (2003)
Theremin Pendulum (2008)
Resonant Platinum Records (2011/12, Soundinstallation at Singuhr Hörgalerie, Berlin).

Literature
Linda Jansma and Carsten Seiffarth (Eds.): Gordon Monahan: Seeing Sound, Sound Art, Performance and Music, 1978-2011, 159 pages plus DVD. Toronto : Doris McCarthy Gallery [et al.], 2011 (Exhibition Catalogue),

References

External links
Official Site
Biography at the Canadian Encyclopedia
Video of his piece "Speaker Swinging"
Dancing to Our Own Rhythm at the Silhouette Newspaper (McMaster University Dance Brain Project)

1956 births
Living people
Artists from Ontario
Canadian composers
Canadian male composers
Canadian contemporary artists
Canadian sound artists
Musicians from Kingston, Ontario
Canadian male pianists
21st-century Canadian pianists
21st-century Canadian male musicians
Governor General's Award in Visual and Media Arts winners